Kim Um-Ji (The romanization preferred by the author according to LTI Korea) (born 1988) is a South Korean writer.

Life 
Kim Um-Ji was born 1988 in Seoul. She began her literary career when her short story "Dwaejiuri" (돼지우리 Pig Pen) was awarded the 2010 New Writer's Award From Literature and Society. She published a short story collection Miraereul domohaneun bangsik gaundae (미래를 도모하는 방식 가운데 Among the Ways of Planning for the Future), and a novel Jumal, chulgeun, sanchaek, eodu-umgwa bi (주말, 출근, 산책: 어두움과 비 Weekend, Going to Work, Taking a Walk: Darkness and Rain). She is a member of the literary group Mugachi. She was awarded the 23rd Kim Jun-seong Literary Award in 2016.

Writing 
The most distinct characteristic in Kim Um-Ji's writing is the repetition of meaningless daily life, and anonymity. Characters in Kim Um-Ji's stories are generally not given names, and are called only by their initials. They do not have any distinguishing characteristics, they cannot properly accomplish anything such as dating, finding a job, or living a married life, and they do not have any ambition for the future. Not only do the characters not have anything special about them, but it is hard to find any particular events in Kim Um-Ji's stories. Her stories have a characteristic of feeling like something almost happened, but did not, and not even giving a slight hint of something happening. Through the meager lives of people caught in the meaningless repetition of daily life, Kim Um-Ji's stories portray a listless life in which a future cannot be imagined.

A weekend of laundry or no laundry; the same commute to work, lunch, and commute back; the few drinks accompanied by side dishes, slightly different each time; meaningless conversations with colleagues everyday; and then again a weekend of laundry or no laundry; commute to work; commute back; drinks; a walk. Such repetitive daily life is pretty much all of what happens in Kim Um-Ji's stories. What Kim Um-Ji's stories show is a world of no disasters or even accidents. It is a world of "worthlessness" where no event that is memorable or meaningful, ever happens. In such a world, the protagonist lives by only timidly striving for basic desires, food, sleep, and sex. Kim Um-Ji narrates such characters’ lives that are meaningless, repetitive, and without any achievements, through a concise style of writing, and the repetition of discontinuous scenes. By portraying the view of the inner side of the protagonist who has lost the ability to imagine for the future, the author evokes the instability of young people in their 20s and 30s.

Works

Awards 
 Kim Jun-seong Literary Award, 2016.

References 

Living people
South Korean women writers
1988 births